The Chalk Mountains are a mountain range in Brewster County, Texas.

References

External links 
 

Mountain ranges of Texas
Landforms of Brewster County, Texas